Jim Meffert (born 1967) is an American politician and a Senior Consultant at Tecker International, LLC. He was the former Executive Director of Jefferson Action and the Jefferson Center. Before that, he served as the Executive Director of the Minnesota Optometric Association and president of the Minnesota Parent-Teacher Association. He previously worked for the American Medical Association and the American Society of Plastic and Reconstructive Surgeons. Meffert lives in Edina and was the Democratic nominee for Minnesota's 3rd congressional district in 2010.

Biography
Meffert was born and raised in Marshall, Minnesota. His father was a teacher and his mother worked at an accounting firm.

After graduating from Marshall Senior High School in 1985, Meffert earned his Bachelor of Arts at St. Olaf College in Northfield, Minnesota where he was president of the College Republicans. He majored in political science, and also played percussion in the St. Olaf Band and Jazz Band. That is where he met his future wife, Karrin, who played clarinet. Karrin and Meffert married in 1991. In 1992, they moved to Chicago so Karrin could attend graduate school at Northwestern University.

In Chicago, Meffert worked for the American Society of Plastic and Reconstructive Surgeons on such issues as coverage for reconstruction after mastectomy and cleft lip and palate repair. He also worked to ensure that access to burn care and reconstructive surgery was included in the Clinton Health Plan proposals. Meffert later went on to work at the American Medical Association.

Meffert and his wife returned to Edina, Minnesota to raise their three children. Alex, Noah, and Katy all attend Edina Public Schools. Both Meffert and his wife served as Co-Presidents of the Parent Teacher Association at their children's elementary school and he then served on the Minnesota State PTA board, where he served as president. Meffert has also chaired the Minnesota Children's Platform Coalition, a statewide network of child advocacy and related organizations. He served on the P-20 Partnership for Education and the Steering Committee for the "Rethinking Public Education" project by the Growth & Justice Foundation.

From 1998 to 2010, Meffert worked full-time as the executive director of the Minnesota Optometric Association.

In January 2012, Meffert was named the executive director of Jefferson Action and the Jefferson Center for New Democratic Processes. Meffert is no longer with Jefferson Action or the Jefferson Center for New Democratic Processes.

2010 Election
On December 1, 2009, Meffert entered the campaign to challenge Representative Erik Paulsen in Minnesota's 3rd congressional district. Meffert won the DFL endorsement in April 2010, edging out forensic psychiatrist Maureen Hackett.

Though Meffert was unable to afford television advertising, he gained some name recognition through television attack ads from the Paulsen campaign. Political analyst Dave Schultz said that "Given how little money that Meffert has, you would've thought Paulsen would've just ignored Meffert completely and just run a positive campaign." Meffert responded to the attack, saying "It's the kind of thing that makes people cynical about politics and politicians. When you hide behind a big bank account and you throw up an ad that's designed to tear down your opponent." After the Paulsen campaign included a misleading graph in a mailing, Meffert filed an ethics complaint against Paulsen.

Paulsen defeated Meffert by a 59% to 37% margin.

References

1967 births
Living people
People from Marshall, Minnesota
Minnesota Democrats
Businesspeople from Minnesota
St. Olaf College alumni